Baby Bear, Baby Bear, What Do You See? is a 2007 children's picture book by Bill Martin, Jr. and  Eric Carle. First published by Henry Holt and Co., it is the fourth and final companion title to Brown Bear, Brown Bear, What Do You See?

Plot
Baby Bear meets all sorts of different animals, including a red fox, flying squirrel, mountain goat, blue heron, prairie dog, striped skunk, mule deer, rattlesnake and screech owl, until he finally finds what he is looking for – his mother.

Notes
This is the final book by Eric Carle before his death in 2021.

References

External links
Library holdings of Baby Bear

2007 children's books
American picture books
Books about bears
Picture books by Eric Carle